Kenneth Hicks (born September 18, 1955) is an American politician who served in the West Virginia House of Delegates representing the 19th district from 2014 until 2020.

References

1955 births
21st-century American politicians
Living people
Democratic Party members of the West Virginia House of Delegates